Meisi Bolaños Weiss (born 27 May 1970) is a Cuban politician and has been the Cuban Minister of Finances and Prices since 2019.

Education and career
She has a law degree. She graduated from the University of Havana in 1993 and also studied the financial administration.

She was legal director of the Ministry of Finances and Prices from 2005 to April 2007. She was appointed deputy minister of finance and prices from April 2007 to 2019. On 8 January 2019, she was appointed Minister of Finances and Prices, and was recently worked with price stability.

References

1970 births
Living people
Cuban economists
Finance ministers of Cuba
Communist Party of Cuba politicians
Members of the National Assembly of People's Power
Women government ministers of Cuba
Female finance ministers
University of Havana alumni
21st-century Cuban women politicians
21st-century Cuban politicians